Chester is a town in Rockingham County, New Hampshire, United States. The population was 5,232 at the 2020 census, up from 4,768 at the 2010 census. It was home to the now defunct Chester College (formerly White Pines College).

History

From Statistics and Gazetteer of New-Hampshire, 1875:
"Chester is considered one of the old towns of the state. In 1719, about eighty persons, chiefly from Portsmouth and Hampton, formed an association, for the purpose of securing a tract of land in the "Chesnut Country" (so called) and stationed three men upon this tract, to hold possession until they should procure a lawful title. After considerable difficulty they obtained a grant of land, ten miles [16 km] square. Immediately the settlement was commenced by several persons from Rye and Hampton, among whom were Samuel Ingalls, Jonathan Goodhue, Jacob Sargent, Ebenezer Dearborn, Robert Smith, E. Colby and S. Robie, who contributed largely to the permanent success of the enterprise. On the 8th of May, 1722 the township which had hitherto been called Cheshire, was incorporated under its present name, and comprising an area of over 120 square miles [310 km2]."

Chester once included Candia, set off in 1763. It may have been the first of the settlement grants by Massachusetts selected for expansion of growing populations in the seacoast. The name may be derived from Chester, the county town of the county of Cheshire in England. Earl of Chester is a title held by the Prince of Wales.

In 1822, a portion of Hooksett was taken from Chester. In 1845, the portion of the town known as Long Meadows was incorporated under the name of Auburn.

Geography

The highest point in town is found on an unnamed hill west of Bell Hill and northwest of Harantis Lake; it has two knobs of almost equal elevation of at least , according to the most recent (2011–2012) USGS 7.5-minute topographical map. The Exeter River rises in Chester. The area of Chester drained by the Exeter and its tributary Towle Brook lies within the Piscataqua River (Coastal) watershed, while the western edge of town drains west toward Massabesic Lake and is in the Merrimack River watershed.

Adjacent municipalities

 Raymond, New Hampshire (north)
 Fremont, New Hampshire (east)
 Sandown, New Hampshire (southeast)
 Derry, New Hampshire (south)
 Auburn, New Hampshire (west)
 Candia, New Hampshire (northwest)

Demographics

As of the census of 2000, there were 3,792 people, 1,214 households, and 1,011 families residing in the town. The population density was 146.4 people per square mile (56.5/km2). There were 1,247 housing units at an average density of 48.1 per square mile (18.6/km2). The racial makeup of the town was 97.97% White, 0.26% African American, 0.42% Native American, 0.32% Asian, 0.16% from other races, and 0.87% from two or more races. Hispanic or Latino of any race were 0.82% of the population.

There were 1,214 households, out of which 45.0% had children under the age of 18 living with them, 73.3% were married couples living together, 6.6% had a female householder with no husband present, and 16.7% were non-families. 11.8% of all households were made up of individuals, and 4.3% had someone living alone who was 65 years of age or older. The average household size was 3.09 and the average family size was 3.38.

In the town, the population was spread out, with 31.0% under the age of 18, 6.3% from 18 to 24, 32.1% from 25 to 44, 24.6% from 45 to 64, and 6.1% who were 65 years of age or older. The median age was 36 years. For every 100 females, there were 97.8 males. For every 100 females age 18 and over, there were 94.4 males.

The median income for a household in the town was $68,571, and the median income for a family was $75,092. Males had a median income of $44,056 versus $35,382 for females. The per capita income for the town was $23,842. About 3.4% of families and 5.0% of the population were below the poverty line, including 5.9% of those under age 18 and 5.2% of those age 65 or over.

Education
Elementary and middle school students attend Chester Academy (public). High school students attend Pinkerton Academy in Derry, a privately operated school that contracts with the towns of Derry, Auburn, Chester, Candia, Hooksett, and Hampstead.

Transportation 
Three New Hampshire state routes cross Chester.

NH 102 follows Derry Road and Raymond Road through town, running from Derry in the southwest to Raymond in the northeast.
NH 121 follows Chester Street and Haverhill Road through town, running from Auburn in the west to Hampstead (via small bits of Derry and Sandown) in the southeast.
NH 121A begins in town just east of the center of town at an intersection with NH 121, and goes east along Sandown Road into Sandown.

Notable people 

 Charles H. Bell (1823–1893), 38th governor of New Hampshire and son of John Bell
 John Bell (1765–1836), 12th governor of New Hampshire
 Samuel Bell (1770–1850), 8th governor of New Hampshire and brother of John Bell
 Samuel Newell Bell (1829–1889), congressman and grandson of Samuel Bell
 Timothy Dexter (1747–1806), businessman, eccentric writer
 Daniel Chester French (1850–1931), sculptor
 George Cochrane Hazelton (1832–1922), congressman from Wisconsin; brother of Gerry Whiting Hazelton
 Gerry Whiting Hazelton (1829–1920), congressman from Wisconsin; brother of George Cochrane Hazelton
 Arthur Livermore (1766–1853), congressman

References

External links
 
 Chester School District – SAU 82
 Chester Historical Society
 New Hampshire Economic and Labor Market Information Bureau Profile

 
Towns in Rockingham County, New Hampshire
Towns in New Hampshire